Josu Etxeberria Azpiricueta (born 9 September 2000) is a Spanish cyclist, who currently rides for UCI ProTeam .

Major results
2019
 1st Stage 4 Vuelta a Palencia
 2nd Overall Vuelta a Cantabria
2020
 1st Overall Vuelta a Zamora
1st Stage 3

References

External links

2000 births
Living people
Spanish male cyclists
Cyclists from Navarre